Pietro Lanfranchi (born 7 November 1978) from Bergamo is an Italian ski mountaineer. He is member of the Lame Perrel GSA Ranica and the national ski mountaineering team.

Selected results 
 2007:
 3rd: Gara del Pizzo Scalino (together with Marco Majori)
 2008:
 1st, Pila Race (together with Daniele Pedrini)
 1st, Gara Scialpinistica "Pizzo Tre Signori" (together with Daniele Pedrini)
 2nd, Trofeo Angelo Gherardi
 2nd, Trofeo Parravicini
 2009:
 1st, Sci Alpinistica dell'Adamello
 2nd, Trofeo Besimauda
 3rd, Transclautana
 8th, European Championship team race (together with Daniele Pedrini)
 2010:
 5th, World Championship team race (together with Daniele Pedrini)
 2011:
 4th, World Championship team race (together with Damiano Lenzi)
 7th, World Championship vertical race
 9th, World Championship vertical, total ranking
 2012:
 5th, European Championship vertical race
 2nd, Sellaronda Skimarathon (together with Florent Troillet)

Pierra Menta 

 2008: 10th, together with Daniele Pedrini
 2009: 8th, together with Daniele Pedrini
 2010: 6th, together with Daniele Pedrini
 2011: 8th, together with Marc Pinsach Rubirola
 2012: 3rd, together with William Bon Mardion

Trofeo Mezzalama 

 2009: 4th, together with Graziano Boscacci and Ivan Murada
 2011: 2nd, together with Daniele Pedrini and Alain Seletto

Patrouille des Glaciers 

 2010: 2nd, together with Matteo Eydallin and Manfred Reichegger

External links 
 Pietro Lanfranchi at skimountaineering.org
 Photo

References 

1978 births
Living people
Italian male ski mountaineers
Sportspeople from Bergamo